The Blue Lagoon Local Nature Reserve is a Local Nature Reserve in Bletchley, Milton Keynes in Buckinghamshire, United Kingdom. The Blue Lagoon is the only Local Nature Reserve in the City of Milton Keynes. The diverse habitat, including shallow and deep water, grassland, scrubland and woodland, hosts an abundance of fauna and flora. The Blue Lagoon is also extensively used as a recreational facility.

History
The Blue Lagoon lies on part of the site of former brickworks (the neighbouring site to the west is now a landfill site). Bletchley lies on the Oxford Clay Belt and the manufacture of bricks was a major industry in Bletchley between when the brickworks were first opened in the 1890s until the development of Milton Keynes in the 1970s. The works on the Blue Lagoon site were closed in 1970 and in 1990 the manufacture of bricks on the neighbouring site finished.

The area of the nature reserve contains two pits: the northern Water Eaton pit, now known as the Blue Lagoon, and the southern Flettons pit. The Water Eaton pit was flooded in the 1940s when the adjoining Water Eaton Brook burst its banks. The pure blue colour of the pit gave the lake its colloquial and now official name. The Flettons pit was used in brick manufacture until 1970 and in the early 1980s was used as a landfill site.

Local Nature Reserve
In the early 1990s, the whole site was redeveloped to upgrade it to Local Nature Reserve status. The two parts of the site retained distinctive characters reflecting their differing history and this adds to the diversity of the site.

The Blue Lagoon itself, the main lake on the site, occupies the northern half of the site, bordered by the Water Eaton Brook to the north, the West Coast Main Line to the east and the Newton Longville Landfill Site to the west. The lake is 18 metres deep and so utilised by the Milton Keynes Sub-Aqua Club. They have planted a bus, two cars and a light aircraft to explore. There are also a further six sunken boats and concrete pipes on the lake bed. The lake supports a diverse ecosystem: pike, perch, roach, crayfish are often reported and tench and carp are occasionally seen. As such, the lake is used as an angling site. The area around the lake is predominantly wooded.

The southern section of the reserve, around what remains of the Flettons pit, is landscaped around former spoil heaps. The area contains scrub and grasslands and is rich in plants and animals, including some abundant in chalk downland areas but rare in Milton Keynes.

The reserve has experienced fly-tipping and vandalism.

References

Further reading

External links
Milton Keynes Council: Parks & Open Spaces - Blue Lagoon Local Nature Reserve
Milton Keynes Sub-Aqua Club
Living Archive Blue Lagoon Project
Buckinghamshire and Milton Keynes Environmental Records Centre

Milton Keynes
Local Nature Reserves in Buckinghamshire